James Bradford Hall (born February 4, 1977) is a former American football defensive end. He played in the National Football League (NFL) with the Detroit Lions from 2000 to 2006 and St. Louis Rams from 2007 to 2011. Hall signed for the Lions as an undrafted free agent in 2000. He played college football at the University of Michigan, where he was three-year starter for the Michigan Wolverines and a member of the national championship 1997 team.

Early years 
Hall earned All-State honors as senior at St. Augustine High School in New Orleans. after totaling 67 tackles, eight sacks, and one interception as senior.

College career
At the University of Michigan, Hall majored in sports marketing and administration and was a three-year starting defensive end for the Michigan Wolverines. Hall had 185 tackles and 25 sacks in his career. Coming off the bench for 11 games, Hall had 17 tackles and three sacks as a redshirt freshman in 1996. Then in 1997, when Michigan won the AP National Championship Trophy, Hall started 11 out of 12 games played at rush linebacker, with 51 tackles and four sacks. As a junior in 1998, Hall was named to the All-Big Ten Conference second-team with career-highs in tackles (63) and sacks (11). In his senior season of 1999, he was a third-team The Sporting News All-American, All-Big Ten honorable mention, and Butkus Award semifinalist after making 54 tackles and seven sacks.

Professional career

Pre-draft

Detroit Lions
He went undrafted in the 2000 NFL Draft, but signed with the Detroit Lions. The Lions signed defensive end James Hall to a three-year deal for $880,000.

In his rookie season of 2000 he played in five games recording one sack. The following season of 2001 he made 35 tackles and four sacks in 15 appearances. In 2002, he made 49 tackles and recorded two sacks.

Prior to the 2003 season Hall signed with the Lions a one-year tender for $1.32 million. During that season of 2003, he started 16 games for the first time in his career, finishing the campaign with 59 tackles and 4.5 sacks.

In 2004, despite suffering a broken hand on the opening weekend at the Chicago Bears, Hall recorded 48 tackles and a career-high 11.5 sacks. This excellent season led to a renegotiation of Hall's contract. The Lions re-signed Hall to a five-year extension. The terms of the new contract was five years for $14 million.

The following campaign, the 2005 season, he recorded 59 tackles (including a career-high nine tackles at the Green Bay Packers on December 11) he also had five sacks on the season.

In 2006, Hall had a career-high 3.5 sacks against the Buffalo Bills on October 15, 2006. The Lions won the game and got their first victory of the 2006 season. He finished his last season at the Lions with 24 tackles and five sacks.

St. Louis Rams
On March 2, 2007, the Detroit Lions traded James Hall to the St. Louis Rams for a conditional draft selection. After two seasons, he was released but later re-signed by the Rams. Hall would go on to start for rest of his tenure in St.Louis and was fairly productive with Chris Long on the other side. He went on to have 250 combined tackles and 30 sacks in five seasons in St. Louis. He was cut on March 12, 2012.

References

External links
 NFL.com profile
 St. Louis Rams profile

1977 births
Living people
American football defensive ends
Detroit Lions players
Michigan Wolverines football players
St. Louis Rams players
St. Augustine High School (New Orleans) alumni
Players of American football from New Orleans
African-American players of American football
21st-century African-American sportspeople
20th-century African-American sportspeople
Ed Block Courage Award recipients